Sajji (Balochi and Urdu: سجی) is a Balochi dish originating from the Balochistan province of Pakistan.

Traditional and authentic sajji consists of lamb, marinated only in salt with a few spices. Sajji is considered done when it is at the 'rare' stage. It is served with rice that is cooked inside the animal, which is baked in an oven, wrapped around a stone "tandoor". Regional varieties are found with subtle differences in flavouring. Notably, in the urban centres of Karachi, Islamabad or Lahore, chicken is used instead of lamb, the sajji is roasted until it is medium or well-done and is served with rice instead of Balochistan's traditional Kaak bread.

See also
 Balochi cuisine
 List of chicken dishes
 List of lamb dishes
 List of stuffed dishes

References

Balochi cuisine
Pakistani cuisine
Lamb dishes
Pakistani chicken dishes
Baked foods
Stuffed dishes
Spit-cooked foods

Sami is also a good dish for lunch